Kovdor is a town and the administrative center of Kovdorsky District of Murmansk Oblast, Russia, mostly known for its mining industry. Population:

History
By 1965, Kovdor was a work settlement in the district of Kirovsk. By the September 20, 1965 Presidium of the Supreme Soviet of the Russian SFSR Decree, it was granted the status of a town under district jurisdiction and subordinated to Kirovsk Town Soviet. However, by the June 28, 1967 Presidium of the Supreme Soviet of the RSFSR Decree, Kovdor was subordinated to Apatity—a town under oblast jurisdiction which was granted this status a year before.

Economy

Kovdor is located in the center of a large mineral resources field. The town's industry is mostly tied to mining. A carbonatite mine is located near the town. Public limited company "Kovdor's Mining Plant" (Kovdorsky gorno-obogatitelny kombinat, or Kovdorsky GOK) is the largest company in the town and in Kovdorsky District. Kovdorsky GOK is a part of Russia's largest mineral fertilizer producer EuroChem.

The area around Kovdor is rich in mica, iron ore, and vermiculite. The town is named after Kovdoro lake.

International relations

Twin towns and sister cities
Kovdor is twinned with:
 Haparanda, Sweden
 Salla, Finland

References

External links
Map of Kovdor

Kovdor-OnLine!

Cities and towns in Murmansk Oblast